The 2015–16 Football League Trophy was the 32nd season in the history of the competition, a knock-out tournament for English football clubs in League One and League Two, the third and fourth tiers of the English football. Barnsley of League One won the competition, defeating Oxford United of League Two 3–2 in the final. It was the last tournament to take place before the introduction of Category 1 Academy teams and an initial group stage before the knockout rounds.

In all, 48 clubs entered the competition. It was split into two sections, Northern and Southern, with the winners of each section contesting the final at Wembley Stadium. Bristol City were the reigning champions but were unable to defend their title following promotion to the Championship.

First round

Northern section

North West 

Byes: Blackpool, Crewe Alexandra, Fleetwood Town, Wigan Athletic

North East 

Byes: Bradford City, Chesterfield, Rochdale, York City

Southern section

South West 

Byes: Bristol Rovers, Coventry City, Oxford United, Wycombe Wanderers

South East 

Byes: Crawley Town, Gillingham, Southend United, Stevenage

Second round

Northern section

North West

North East

Southern section

South West

South East

Area quarter-finals

Northern section

Southern section

Area semi-finals

Northern section

Southern section

Area finals

Northern section

Southern section

Final

References

External links

EFL Trophy
Trophy
Football League Trophy